William Joseph Kayatta Jr. (born October 27, 1953) is an American lawyer who serves as a United States circuit judge of the United States Court of Appeals for the First Circuit.

Early life and education 
Kayatta was born in Pawtucket, Rhode Island in 1953. He earned a Bachelor of Arts degree in 1976 from Amherst College and then earned a Juris Doctor in 1979 from Harvard Law School. After law school, he served as a law clerk for Chief Judge Frank M. Coffin of the United States Court of Appeals for the First Circuit from 1979 to 1980.

Professional career 
In 1980, Kayatta joined the Portland, Maine, law firm Pierce Atwood LLP as an associate. He became partner in 1986 and has focused his practice on complex trial and appellate litigation. He also has argued two cases before the Supreme Court of the United States. In 2010, he served as the lead investigator for the American Bar Association committee that reviewed the qualifications of Supreme Court nominee Elena Kagan. In April 2011, the Supreme Court of the United States appointed him to serve as special master in an interstate water-rights dispute, Kansas v. Nebraska and Colorado. Approximately four years later, after he had become a Judge, the United States Supreme Court adopted his Special Master's Report in full.

He has served as president of the Maine Bar Foundation. In 2010, the Maine Bar Foundation presented him with the Howard H. Dana Award for his career-long pro bono efforts on behalf of low-income Maine citizens. He has also received special recognition awards from the Disability Rights Center of Maine, the Maine Equal Justice Partners, and the Maine Children's Alliance for his pro bono representation of disabled Maine children. Kayatta is also a former Chair of the Professional Ethics Commission for Maine lawyers.

Federal judicial service 
On January 23, 2012, President Barack Obama nominated Kayatta to serve as a United States Circuit Judge of the United States Court of Appeals for the First Circuit. Kayatta nominated to a seat vacated by Judge Kermit Lipez, who assumed senior status at the end of 2011. He received a hearing before the Senate Judiciary Committee on March 14, 2012, and his nomination was reported to the floor on April 19, 2012, by voice vote, with Senator Sessions and Senator Lee recorded as voting no.

Kayatta's confirmation hearing before the Senate Judiciary Committee was uncontroversial. His nomination needed only confirmation by the full Senate, but the process was stalled by GOP filibusters for a series of tactical reasons, such as to block the consideration of another of President Obama's judicial appointments, Robert E. Bacharach. With the adjournment of the Senate session on January 2, 2013, the nomination expired.

On January 3, 2013, he was renominated to the same judgeship. On February 7, 2013, the Senate Judiciary Committee reported his nomination to the floor by voice vote, with Senator Jeff Sessions recorded as a no vote. The Senate confirmed his nomination on February 13, 2013, by a 88–12 vote. He received his commission on February 14, 2013.

Notable cases 

In August 2017, Kayatta wrote for the divided en banc circuit when it rejected a lawsuit seeking to give Puerto Ricans the right to vote, over the dissents of Judges Lipez, Juan R. Torruella, and Ojetta Rogeriee Thompson.

In April 2020, Kayatta wrote for the unanimous panel when it found that the Board of Immigration Appeals had erred in denying asylum in the United States to a domestic abuse survivor without considering her particular allegations.

In July 2020, Judge Kayatta was part of an appellate court decision that tossed out the death sentence and overturned three of the firearm convictions of Boston Marathon bomber,  Dzhokhar Tsarnaev. The court cited errors in the sentencing proceedings that found Dzhokhar guilty and condemned him to death.

Personal 
Kayatta lives in Maine.

References

External links 
 
 Appearances at the U.S. Supreme Court from the Oyez Project
 

1953 births
21st-century American judges
Amherst College alumni
Harvard Law School alumni
Living people
Maine lawyers
People from Pawtucket, Rhode Island
Judges of the United States Court of Appeals for the First Circuit
United States court of appeals judges appointed by Barack Obama